Vitsut is an Estonian surname. Notable people with the surname include:

Mihkel Vitsut (1866–1933), Estonian chemist and professor
Toomas Vitsut (born 1960), Estonian politician and businessman

Estonian-language surnames